Philippe Taviand dit Vianadt (Lons-le-Saunier, 1797 – Paris, 1825) was a 19th-century French playwright

He died at a very young age.The only play we are informed he worked on was a one-act vaudeville by Félix-Auguste Duvert entitled  Ma femme se marie, presented at the Théâtre du Vaudeville on 11 December 1824.

19th-century French dramatists and playwrights
People from Lons-le-Saunier
1797 births
1825 deaths